The Mettenberg (also spelled Mättenberg) is a mountain of the Bernese Alps, overlooking Grindelwald in the Bernese Oberland. It lies north of the Schreckhorn and forms a huge buttress of the Schreckhorn range.

From Grindelwald, an aerial tramway goes as high as Pfingstegg (1,387 m), which is situated below the first cliffs of the mountain.

References

External links

 Mettenberg on Hikr

Bernese Alps
Mountains of the Alps
Alpine three-thousanders
Mountains of Switzerland
Mountains of the canton of Bern